Peter Fay may refer to:
Peter T. Fay, (born 1929), American lawyer and judge
Peter W. Fay (1924–2004), professor and historian focusing on India and China